The Annenberg Center on Communication Leadership & Policy (CCLP) at the University of Southern California promotes interdisciplinary research in communications between the USC School of Cinematic Arts, Viterbi School of Engineering, and the separate USC Annenberg School for Communication and Journalism, also funded by Walter Annenberg.

Personnel

People affiliated with the CCLP include Julian Bleecker, John Seely Brown, Vinton Cerf, Bill Dutton, John Gage, Joi Ito, Merlyna Lim, Eli Noam, Howard Rheingold, Adrienne Russell, Larry Smarr,  Robert Stein, Douglas Thomas, and Robert Winter.

2007 reconfiguration

In March 2007, it was announced that, effective July 2007, the focus of the Annenberg Center for Communication funding strategy would undergo a major shift towards primarily funding graduate fellowships in interdisciplinary research with US$4 million annually planned for 100+ graduate fellowships.

References

 

Centers of the University of Southern California